The fabulous green sphinx moth or fabulous green sphinx of Kauai (Tinostoma smaragditis) is a species of moth in the family Sphingidae. It is monotypic within the genus Tinostoma. It is endemic to the Hawaiian Islands and was thought to be extinct until it was rediscovered in 1998. The genus was erected by Walter Rothschild and Karl Jordan in 1903 and the species was first described by Edward Meyrick in 1899.

Its natural habitats are dry and lowland moist forests. It is threatened by habitat loss.

History
Entomologist Benjamin Preston Clark, who had all but a few of the world's known Sphingidae in his collection, for long had a standing offer of one hundred dollars for a specimen of this moth. In 1919, he even sent August Kusche on a special expedition to Kauai to search for it. Kusche spent from January to April 1919 searching in the area from Kokee to Kaholuamano without collecting the moth. He returned to the area in August and September, and renewed the search in April 1920. It was not found. Kusche reported that, during August and September, he had reared 22 caterpillars which he considered to be those of the green sphinx. He said that he had found the caterpillars on Lysimachia hillebrandi. However, Kusche never produced an adult. He was recalled to California by illness in the family, and he reportedly left the pupae on Kauai because he thought that "bringing them down from the high altitudes would kill them." He also confided in local entomologists that he had seen the moths flying about Metrosideros trees, but that they were always too high for him to capture.

References

External links
Fabulous green sphinx moth (Tinostoma smaragditis) at arkive.org, including photographs of live specimens

Philampelini
Endemic moths of Hawaii
Endangered fauna of Hawaii
Taxonomy articles created by Polbot